Other Worlds is Screaming Trees' 1985 debut EP. It was produced by Steve Fisk and recorded in 1985 at his studio in Ellensburg, WA. It was released on Velvetone Records later that year as a cassette only release, and distributed by K Records. The album was later re-released on CD and 12" black vinyl by SST Records in 1988.

Steve Fisk recalled that during the recording process the band faced him and Sam Albright in the studio as if it was a live show. In his 2020 memoir, Mark Lanegan stated that the song 'Pictures in My Mind' was the first Screaming Trees song that he wrote with Gary Lee Conner in the Conner's house in Ellensburg, Washington.

Track listing

Personnel
Screaming Trees
 Mark Lanegan – vocals
 Gary Lee Conner – guitar
 Van Conner – bass 
 Mark Pickerel – drums, cover art

Additional
 Steve Fisk – producer, organ on "The Turning" and "Pictures in My Mind"
 Sam Albright – engineering
 Matt Varnum – photography

References

Screaming Trees albums
1986 EPs
Grunge EPs

it:Other Worlds